Ernst H. Krause (2 May 1913 in Milwaukee, Wisconsin – 23 August 1989 in Newport Beach, California) was an American nuclear physicist and aerospace executive. He participated in early radar and rocketry research at the Naval Research Laboratory as the first chairman of the Upper Atmosphere Research Panel, working with Milton Rosen and succeeded by James Van Allen. His body of work includes experiments studying the upper atmosphere after World War II using captured V-2 rockets. From 1947 to 1951 he was involved in the first atomic testing at Enewetak Atoll in the Pacific, and later worked at the Lockheed Missiles and Space Company. In 1955 he started the Systems Research Corporation, which later became Ford Aerospace.

Selected publications
 The Sensitized Fluorescence of Potassium (PhD thesis, U. Wisconsin at Madison, 1938) 
 Cosmic Radiation Above 40 Miles, Physical Review 70,223 (1946) 
 Additional Cosmic-Ray Measurements with the V-2 Rocket, Physical Review 70,776 (1946) 
 Further Cosmic-Ray Experiments above the Atmosphere, Physical Review 71,918 (1947) 
 V-2 Cloud-Chamber Observation of a Multiply Charged Primary Cosmic Ray, Physical Review 75,524 (1949)

Selected patents
 : Modulation-on-pulse control systems
 : Pulse group selectors
 : Discriminator circuits
 : Electric counting and integration system
 : Remote echo ranging system
 : Pulse signaling system
 : Secret pulse signaling system

External links
 Oral history interview from the AIP Center for History of Physics (1982) 
 Oral history interview from the AIP Center for History of Physics (1983) 
 Oral history interview of Richard Garwin referring to Ernst Krause's work on the George test during Operation Greenhouse (2001) 
 NASA history of rocketry: Chapters 1  and 3 
 James van Allen's notes on the history of rocketry (U. Iowa) 
 Obituary from The New York Times 
 Obituary from the Los Angeles Times 
 University of Wisconsin Madison Distinguished Service Award 
 Obituary of Milton Rosen from The Washington Post 
 Notes Regarding History of V-2 Operations at White Sands, NASA 
 First Among Equals, NASA 
 Operation Ivy, Report of Commander (1952) 

1913 births
1989 deaths
American nuclear physicists
Lockheed Missiles and Space Company people